A loafer is a type of shoe.

Loafer may refer to:

Film and television
Loafer (1973 film), Bollywood film starring Dharmendra and Mumtaz
Loafer (1996 film), Bollywood film starring Anil Kapoor and Juhi Chawla
Loafer (2011 film), Oriya film starring Babushan, Archita Sahu and Budhaditya
Loafer (2013 film), Nepali film
Loafer (2015 film), Telugu film starring Varun Tej, Disha Patani, Revathi and Posani Krishna Murali

People
Loafer Band, a band of Sioux people

See also
LowFER, low-frequency experimental radio
Slacker, a person who habitually avoids work
Great Plains wolf, also known as a loafer